Wilhelmina Jenneke Helena (Helma) Lodders (born 21 June 1968 in Klundert) is a Dutch politician. As a member of the People's Party for Freedom and Democracy (Volkspartij voor Vrijheid en Democratie) she has been an MP since 17 June 2010. She focuses on matters of nature, labour markets, healthcare science education and casualties of war.

She was a member of the municipal council of Zeewolde from 1998 to 2002 and an alderwoman from the same municipality from 2002 to 2008.

References 
  Parlement.com biography

External links 
  Helma Lodders personal website
  House of Representatives biography
  People's Party for Freedom and Democracy website 

1968 births
Living people
Aldermen in Flevoland
People from Zeewolde
Members of the House of Representatives (Netherlands)
Municipal councillors in Flevoland
People from Moerdijk
People's Party for Freedom and Democracy politicians
21st-century Dutch politicians
21st-century Dutch women politicians